The 1993 Commonwealth of Independent States Cup was the first edition of the competition between the champions of former republics of Soviet Union. It was won by Spartak Moscow who defeated Belarusian side Belarus Minsk in the final.

Participants

1 Belarus Minsk (formerly a reserve team for Dinamo Minsk) replaced 1992 champions Dinamo Minsk, whose almost entire squad at the same time traveled to play friendly matches in South America as a part of Belarus national football team.
2 Homenetmen Yerevan were one of two teams equally declared 1992 Armenian champions along with Shirak.
3 Pakhtakor Tashkent were one of two teams equally declared 1992 Uzbekistan champions along with Neftchi Fergana.
4 Regar Tursunzoda replaced champions Pamir Dushanbe, who refused to participate.
5 Due to political situation in Crimea and Black Sea area,  Tavriya Simferopol (1992 Ukrainian champions) were originally drawn into Group C. They were not allowed to compete by Football Federation of Ukraine and were replaced by unofficial participants Russia U19 national team.

Group stage

Group A

Results

Group B

Results

Group C
Unofficial table

Official table

Results

The match was awarded as 3–0 win for Russia as Kairat refused to play against unofficial participant.

Group D

Results

Final rounds

Semi-finals

Final

Top scorers

See also
 1991–92 Soviet Cup

References

External links
 1993 Commonwealth of Independent States Cup at RSSSF

1993
1993 in Russian football
1992–93 in European football
January 1993 sports events in Russia
1993 in Moscow